Victoria Waterfield is a fictional character played by Deborah Watling in the long-running British science fiction television series Doctor Who. A native of Victorian England, she was a companion of the Second Doctor and a regular in the programme from 1967 to 1968. Only two complete serials to feature her exist in the BBC archives (The Tomb of the Cybermen and The Enemy of the World). DVDs of her adventures The Evil of the Daleks, The Ice Warriors, The Web of Fear and Fury from the Deep were also released, where official BBC reconstructions complete the missing episodes of those serials. Watling reprised her role in the spin-off Downtime and a few audio dramas, one of which featured her as a temporary assistant to the Sixth Doctor. Victoria appeared in 7 stories (39 episodes).

Casting
According to the short BBC Video documentary The Dalek Factor about the making of the story, released in September 2021 as part of the animated restoration of the serial, Denise Buckley was cast in the role of Victoria Waterfield by director Derek Martinus. The production team had been hoping that Pauline Collins would continue in the role of Sam Briggs, that she had played in the previous story The Faceless Ones, but had created Victoria as a potential ongoing character should Collins decline. When Collins confirmed she did not want to join the regular cast, it was decided to introduce Victoria as the new companion and Denise Buckley was released, but paid in full, with Deborah Watling replacing her as a more suitable actress for the continuing role.

Character history
Victoria first appears in the 1967 serial The Evil of the Daleks. She is the daughter of widowed scientist Edward Waterfield (played by John Bailey), who in 1866 is experimenting with time travel and has attracted the attention of the Daleks. In order to assure Waterfield's collaboration with their capture of the Doctor and their experiments with the Human and Dalek Factors, the Daleks with the help of Theodore Maxtable took Victoria as a prisoner. To measure his emotional responses, they then manipulated Jamie McCrimmon into rescuing her, although they ultimately re-captured her and took her to Skaro. At the conclusion of the adventure, Waterfield is killed saving the Doctor's life, and asks him to take care of Victoria. The Doctor and Jamie take her in as part of the TARDIS crew.

On the outside, Victoria is a typically fragile lady of her era, frequently screaming when faced with the creatures the Doctor and his companions encounter in their travels, such as the Cybermen and the Yeti. However, this exterior hides an inner strength that crops up when needed. Victoria may be young, but she has an instinct for when she is being lied to, and her sensibility is a contrast to the recklessness of Jamie and the curiosity of the Doctor. Jamie, in particular, is very protective towards and fond of Victoria, and is heartbroken when she chooses to leave.

Despite being a good match to her two companions, Victoria eventually finds herself unsuited to extended travel with the Doctor. At the conclusion of the serial Fury from the Deep, she decides to leave the TARDIS, settling with a family named Harris in the 20th century. Her subsequent life is not shown in the television series. She is mentioned, but not seen to be travelling with the Second Doctor in the 1985 serial The Two Doctors.

Other appearances
Victoria's life after leaving the TARDIS is not explored in the series. The video release Downtime (1995) and its 1996 novelisation by Marc Platt as part of the Virgin Missing Adventures range, reveals that she struggles to adapt to twentieth century life and eventually returns to the Detsen monastery in Tibet, where she again falls under the influence of the Great Intelligence, now trapped on Earth after the end of The Web of Fear. The Intelligence manipulates Victoria into founding New World University, with the money left to her by her father (via a new will he drew up whilst working for the Daleks in 1866), where Victoria serves as Vice Chancellor and the possessed Professor Travers as Chancellor. Using the university's computers, the Intelligence seizes control of the internet and creates new Yetis. Realising she has been misled, Victoria helps Brigadier Lethbridge-Stewart and Sarah Jane Smith defeat it. She is then approached by both the Fourth and Third Doctors, but chooses not to travel with them.

The 1993 Children in Need campaign featured a short Doctor Who/EastEnders crossover called Dimensions in Time. In a story involving the various incarnations of the Doctor meeting up with various companions, Victoria ends up alongside the Third Doctor (Jon Pertwee) as they make their way back to the TARDIS after finding out that the culprit behind all the confusion is the Rani (Kate O'Mara). Watling had suffered a broken arm prior to filming, and so wore a long cloak to conceal her cast.

Watling also returned to the role of Victoria Waterfield in the audio drama Power Play, where she was campaigning against nuclear waste before she became caught up in a plot to frame the Doctor for the actions of an assassin who destroys entire planets, resulting in her meeting the Sixth Doctor and Peri Brown; as in Downtime, she declined the offer to rejoin the Doctor, but was assured that the TARDIS doors will always be open to her.

List of appearances

Television serials
Season 4
The Evil of the Daleks (episodes 2–7)
Season 5
The Tomb of the Cybermen
The Abominable Snowmen
The Ice Warriors
The Enemy of the World (episodes 1–3, 5–6)
The Web of Fear
Fury from the Deep
30th anniversary charity special
Dimensions in Time

Video
Downtime (also novelised by scriptwriter Marc Platt as part of the Virgin Missing Adventures line)

Audio
The Great Space Elevator
The Emperor of Eternity
Power Play (with the Sixth Doctor)
The Black Hole
The Story of Extinction

Short Trips audios
The Way Forward

Novels
Virgin Missing Adventures
Twilight of the Gods by Christopher Bulis
The Dark Path by David A. McIntee

Past Doctor Adventures
Dreams of Empire by Justin Richards
Heart of TARDIS by Dave Stone
Combat Rock by Mick Lewis

Short stories
"Face-Painter" by Tara Samms (Short Trips: A Universe of Terrors)
"The Astronomer's Apprentice" by Simon A. Forward (Short Trips: The Muses)
"The Farmer's Story" by Todd Green (Short Trips: Repercussions)
"The Age of Ambition" by Andrew Campbell (Short Trips: Life Science)
"Screamager" by Jacqueline Rayner (Short Trips: Monsters)
"The Last Emperor" by Jacqueline Rayner (Short Trips: 2040)
"The Cutty Wren" by Ann Kelly (Short Trips: The Ghosts of Christmas)
"On a Pedestal" by Kathleen O. David (Short Trips: The Quality of Leadership)

Comics
"Freedom by Fire" by David Brian (Doctor Who Annual 1969)
"Atoms Infinite" by David Brian (Doctor Who Annual 1969)
"Bringer of Darkness" by Warwick Gray and Martin Geraghty (Doctor Who Magazine Summer Special 1993)

References

External links

 Victoria Waterfield on the BBC's Doctor Who website

Television characters introduced in 1967
Doctor Who companions
British female characters in television
Fictional people from the 19th-century
Orphan characters in television